"The Modern World" is a single released by the British group The Jam on 28 October 1977. It was later included on the band's second album, This Is the Modern World.

The single's A-side was backed by the tracks "Sweet Soul Music", and "Back in My Arms Again", recorded live at London's 100 Club on 11 September 1977. The song reached No. 36 in the UK Singles Chart, although the single version had slightly changed lyrics; replacing the words "I don't give two fucks about your review" with "I don't give a damn about your review".

References

1977 singles
The Jam songs
Songs written by Paul Weller
Polydor Records singles
1977 songs